Nehalennia (spelled variously) is a goddess of unclear origin, perhaps Germanic or Celtic. She is attested on and depicted upon numerous votive altars discovered around what is now the province of Zeeland, the Netherlands, where the Schelde River flowed into the North Sea. Worship of Nehalennia dates back at least to the 2nd century BC, and veneration of the goddess continued to flourish in northern Europe in the 2nd and 3rd centuries AD.

Name
While the meaning of the name Nehalennia remains disputed, linguists agree that its origin is not Latin. Given the locations where most references and artifacts have been found, her name is likely from either a Germanic or Celtic language. Gutenbrunner (1936) related it to Proto-Germanic *nehwa "close", but could not explain the rest of the name. Gysseling (1960) believed that the name was neither Celtic nor Germanic, rather stemming from the Proto-Indo-European root *neiH- "to lead". He could not trace the rest of the name. De Stempel (2004) links her name with Welsh halein "salt" and heli "sea", proposing a Celtic origin. She deconstructs the name as a combination of Celtic *halen– "sea" and *ne- "on, at". Finally, *-ja is a suffix forming a feminine noun. The meaning would be "she who is at the sea".

Inscriptions
Nehalennia is attested on 28 inscriptions discovered in 1645 in the Dutch town of Domburg on the Zeeland coast, when a storm eroded dunes. The remains of a temple were revealed that was devoted to the previously unattested goddess Nehalennia. Beginning in 1970, numerous altars, remains of female sculptures and related artifacts were found near in the town of Colijnsplaat, including roof tiles and remains of the temple devoted to Nehalennia that was in a former town, now lost. Two other temple remains have been found in the Cologne-Deutz area of what is now Cologne, Germany.

Dutch archeologist J.E. Bogaers and Belgian linguist Maurits Gysseling, in their joint publication Over de naam van de godin Nehalennia ("On the name of the goddess Nehalennia"), listed several different forms of the name that appear in inscriptions. While Nehalennia is by far the most common spelling, Nehalenia and Nehalaennia both appear a few times. Gysseling characterizes these two forms as Latinisations of the more archaic Nehalennia. Several sporadic spellings, which are attested once each, were considered by Bogaers as non-standard or rejected as misread, due to the poor state of some of the inscriptions. Gysseling holds that some spellings are a transliteration, an attempt to approximate the pronunciation of her name in Latin script, suggesting that the "h" may have been pronounced as some German ch sound. One of the numerous altars dredged up from the Oosterschelde near Colijnsplaat in 1970 features the spelling Nechalenia. It appears that spellings with 𐌝 are intentional and not due to damaged artifacts.

The Domburg inscriptions to Nehalennia inspired Marcus Zuerius van Boxhorn to produce a hasty etymology linking the name Nehalennia to an ancient Scythian. With the linguistic tools then available, Van Boxhorn attempted to bridge the already-known connections between European languages and modern Persian.

Depictions
Nehalennia is almost always depicted with marine symbols and a large, benign-looking dog at her feet. She must have been a Celtic or Germanic deity, who was attributed power over trading, shipping, and possible horticulture and fertility. In sculptures and reliefs, she is depicted as a  young woman, generally seated. Typically she wears a short cloak over her shoulders and chest. This garment is unique to her and therefore might have belonged to the costumes usual at that period in this region. Often she is accompanied by a dog; she has as attributes a basket of apples or bread loaves and ship parts. 
Hilda Ellis Davidson describes the votive objects:
Nehalennia, a Germanic goddess worshipped at the point where travellers crossed the North Sea from the Netherlands, is shown on many carved stones holding loaves and apples like a Mother Goddess, sometimes with a prow of a ship beside her, but also frequently with an attendant dog which sits looking up at her (Plate 5). This dog is on thirteen of the twenty-one altars recorded by Ada Hondius-Crone (1955:103), who describes it as a kind of greyhound.
Davidson further links the motif of the ship associated with Nehalennia with the Germanic Vanir pair of Freyr and Freyja, as well as the Germanic goddess Nerthus. She notes that Nehalennia features some of the same attributes as the Matres.

The loaves that Nehalennia is depicted with on her altars have been identified as duivekater, "oblong sacrificial loaves in the shape of a shin bone". Davidson says that loaves of this type may take the place of an animal sacrifice or animal victim, such as the boar-shaped loaf baked at Yule in Sweden. In Värmland, Sweden, "within living memory," there was a custom of grain from the last sheaf of the harvest customarily being used to bake a loaf in the shape of a little girl; this is subsequently shared by the whole household. Davidson provides further examples of elaborate harvest loaves in the shape of sheaves, and displayed in churches for the fertility of fields in Anglo-Saxon England, with parallels in Scandinavia and Ireland.

In 2005, a replica of the temple was built in Colijnsplaat. The design of temple and its sculpture is based on the finds from the nearby area, as well as archaeological study of the type of sanctuaries in the Roman provinces of Gaul and Germania. For the reconstruction, authentic materials and techniques were used as much as possible.

Temples

Religious practices surrounding Nehalennia were at their peak in the 2nd and 3rd centuries AD, at which time there were at least two or three temples located in the area of what is now Zeeland. At the time, this region on the sea coast was an important link for the trade between the Rhine area and Britain. It is known that the Morini, who lived on the North Sea coast, worshipped Nehalennia. Visitors came to worship from as far away as Besançon, France and Trier, Germany. Nehalennia had two sanctuaries or shrines, embellished with numerous altars: one at Domburg on the island of Walcheren, and another at Colijnsplaat on the shore of the Oosterschelde.

In August 2005, a replica of the Nehalennia temple near the lost town of Ganuenta was opened in Colijnsplaat.

In popular culture
Dutch band Twigs & Twine call upon Nehalennia in one of the songs on their 2019 album Long Story Short. 
 
Dutch band Heidevolk wrote a song about Nehalennia that is included on their album Uit oude grond.

In the Japanese manga Sailor Moon and its anime adaptation, Queen Nehelenia is the Queen of the Dead Moon and an embodiment of Chaos.

See also
 Asteroid 2462, or 6578 P-L, an asteroid named after the goddess.
 Germanic paganism
 Iðunn, North Germanic goddess associated with apples
 Matres
 Mythology of the Low Countries
 Zeeland

Notes

References

 Davidson, H. R. Ellis (1990). Gods and Myths of Northern Europe. Penguin Books. .
 Davidson, Hilda Ellis (1998). Roles of the Northern Goddess. Routledge. 
 Green, Miranda (1992). Symbol and Image in Celtic Religious Art. Routledge.
 Green, Miranda (1998). Animals in Celtic Life and Myth. Routledge.
 Simek, Rudolf (2007) translated by Angela Hall. Dictionary of Northern Mythology. D.S. Brewer. 
 Van der Velde, Koert (August 13, 2005). "Zeeuwse godin weer thuis", Trouw (Dutch newspaper).

Further reading
 Raepsaet-Charlier, Marie-Thérèse. "Nouveaux cultores de Nehalennia. In: L'antiquité classique'', Tome 72, 2003. pp. 291-302. [DOI: https://doi.org/10.3406/antiq.2003.2529]; www.persee.fr/doc/antiq_0770-2817_2003_num_72_1_2529

External links
 Official site of the Nehalennia temple replica 

Celtic goddesses
Germanic goddesses
Fertility goddesses
Sea and river goddesses
Prehistoric Netherlands
History of religion in the Netherlands
History of Zeeland